The St. Louis Stampede were a professional arena football team based in St. Louis, Missouri. The team was a member of the Central Division of the American Conference, in the Arena Football League (AFL). The Stampede competed in the 1995 and 1996 seasons, playing their home games in the Kiel Center (since renamed the Enterprise Center), also the home of the St. Louis Blues of the National Hockey League.

The Stampede were coached by Earle Bruce during the 1995 season, and for the first 4 games of the 1996 season, before he announced his resignation to spend more time with his family.
The Stampede qualified for the playoffs during both seasons of their existence, but folded after the completion of their second season in 1996. Reaching the playoffs both seasons, they scored 49 points in two first-round games. However, they lost both.

Season-by-season

|-
|1995 || 9 || 3 || 0 || || Lost Quarterfinals (Albany 51-49)
|-
|1996 || 8 || 6 || 0 || || Lost Quarterfinals (Iowa 52-49)
|-
!Totals || 17 || 11 || 0
|colspan="2"| (including playoffs)
|}

Players of note

Arena Football Hall of Famers

All-Arena players
The following Stampede players were named to All-Arena Teams:
 FB/LB Bernard Hall (1)
 WR/LB Darryl Hammond (2)
 OL/DL Fran Papasedero (1)

Coaches of note

Head coaches
Note: Statistics are correct through the end of the 1996 Arena Football League season.

References

External links
 St. Louis Stampede at ArenaFan.com

 
American football teams in Missouri